Rudolf Illovszky (21 February 1922 – 23 September 2008) was a Hungarian football player and manager. He was both a player and manager of Vasas SC. He also served as the manager of the Hungary national football team from 1971 to 1974. 

A football stadium in Budapest, Hungary was named after Illovszky on February 12, 1960.

He died in Budapest from pneumonia.

Honours

Player
Vasas SC
Hungarian Cup: 1955
Mitropa Cup: 1956

Manager
Vasas SC
Hungarian League: 1961, 1962, 1965, 1977
Hungarian Cup: 1986
Mitropa Cup: 1960, 1962, 1965

Hungary
Olympic medal: 1972
UEFA Euro 1972: fourth place

Personal honours
Béla Bay Prize: 2002

See also
List of one-club men

References

1922 births
2008 deaths
Hungarian footballers
Hungarian football managers
Hungary national football team managers
Footballers from Budapest
Hungarian people of Polish descent
UEFA Euro 1972 managers
Vasas SC players
Vasas SC managers
FC Admira Wacker Mödling managers
Deaths from pneumonia in Hungary
Expatriate football managers in Austria
Expatriate football managers in Greece
Hungarian expatriate football managers
Association football midfielders
Hungary international footballers
Nemzeti Bajnokság I managers